is a Japanese playwright, screenwriter, actor and film director and was previously married to Japanese actress Satomi Kobayashi. He was named after Taihō Kōki, the youngest sumo wrestler to become yokozuna. He studied dramatics at Nihon University.

In an attempt to add his own character to his movies, as a director he takes most of his scenes with a one-scene=one-shot system, moving the camera around as opposed to cutting. He claims this comes from his experience in theatre, where there are no cuts. Mitani does not use a computer.

Early life
Mitani liked watching TV dramas and puppetries of NHK in his childhood. He was especially interested in works of puppetry such as "Shin Hakkenden" and Sangokushi, jidaigeki dramas such as Tenka Gomen and Tenka Dōdō, and Taiga dramas such as Kaze to Kumo to Niji to.

Throughout his life, he has expressed interest in works starring famous detectives, such as the Sherlock Holmes series.岡崎信治郎・藤田健一編『シャーロックホームズ冒険ファンブック』、小学館、2014年、21頁。Shinjirō Okazaki and Kenichi Fujita (ed.) Sharokku Hōmuzu bōken fan bukku(Guidebook of "Sherlock Holmes"), Tokyo, Shogakukan, 2014, p.21. He has collected numerous novel volumes, pastiches, and DVDs related to Sherlock Holmes, and in 2014 adapted the story into a puppetry set in a boarding school. In his high school days, he planned to produce a film featuring a detective, loosely based on And Then There Were None, and went on location to Enoshima, Kanagawa with his friends, though this film was never finished.

Mitani has also stated that he enjoys foreign cinema, and is a fan of the films 12 Angry Men, The Wages of Fear, Columbo, and the director Billy Wilder. He has mentioned how he believes Hollywood comedy films are not as funny as those in the Golden Age and as Japanese comedy improves.

Career
Mitani's work has primarily comprised witty comedies which are often parodies. In production, he usually writes scripts visualizing actors and actresses as close to the characters. Mitani is the author of a weekly column in the Asahi Shimbun daily newspaper in which he often discusses his favorite films, his writing process, and the actors and actresses with whom he has worked.

Feature films and TV dramas
(Note: Many of Mitani's films began as successful plays.)12 Nin no Yasashii Nihonjin: 12 Gentle Japanese (1991)Furi-kaereba Yatsu Ga Iru (TV)Furuhata Ninzaburō (TV series)Shinsengumi! (TV series)Sōrito Yobanaide (TV series)Rajio no Jikan: Welcome Back, Mr. McDonald (1997)Minna no Ie aka Everyone's Home (2001)Warai no Daigaku: University of Laughs (2004)The Uchoten Hotel aka Suite Dreams (2006)The Magic Hour (2008) Gaki No Tsukai Silent Library (2008)Walking, Talking (2011 TV movie, post-production)Wagaya no rekishi (2010 TV series)A Ghost of a Chance (2011 screenplay)
大空港2013 (2013 TV movie) - Big Airport 2013The Kiyosu Conference (2013)Galaxy Turnpike (2015)Sanada Maru (2016 TV series)Fūunji tachi (2018 TV)Kuroido Goroshi (2018 TV)Hit me Anyone One More Time (2019)The 13 Lords of the Shogun (2022 TV series)

Theatre worksThe Show Must Go On (1991)Warai no Daigaku: University of Laughs (2004)Vamp Show (2006)Talk Like Singing (2009)

PuppetriesThe Three MusketeersSherlock Holmes''

Frequent collaborators

Honours
Medal with Purple Ribbon (2017)

Notes

External links
Mitani Koki on IMDB

1961 births
Japanese dramatists and playwrights
Japanese film directors
Japanese film producers
Japanese essayists
Japanese male actors
Nihon University alumni
Recipients of the Medal with Purple Ribbon
People from Tokyo
Living people